Philippe Willems (born 30 May 1950) is a Belgian former sailor. He competed in the Finn event at the 1984 Summer Olympics.

References

External links
 

1950 births
Living people
Belgian male sailors (sport)
Olympic sailors of Belgium
Sailors at the 1984 Summer Olympics – Finn
Sportspeople from Antwerp Province